RTÉ Cór na nÓg (RTÉ Children's Choir in English) is an Irish children's choir. The choir is part of RTÉ Performing Groups.

History 
The choir was founded in 1985 by RTÉ choral director Colin Mawby. As of 2018, the group had 62 members, with choristers ranging from the ages of 10 to 15. The group has performed at venues such as the National Concert Hall, the National Gallery of Ireland, Christ Church Cathedral, Dublin, and the 3Arena. Performances are sometimes made with the RTÉ National Symphony Orchestra and the RTÉ Concert Orchestra. The choir also sometimes appears on RTÉ Television and RTÉ Radio, with some radio work being done on RTÉ lyric fm. The choir have previously appeared on religious programmes on RTÉ One. Recordings have included Gerard Victory's Ultima Rerum, the CD/Video Faith of Our Fathers, Scenes of an Irish Christmas and a CD of Christmas produced for RTÉ lyric fm and the RTÉ Guide in 2005.

The choir have also performed at the Dublin International Organ Festival, various Opera Ireland productions, Opera Theatre Company's Cinderella and the Russian State Ballet's Nutcracker. During 2007 the group had 9 public performances, including one in Dublin Castle for an EBU Radio Assembly  and Gustav Mahler's Symphony of a Thousand at the National Basketball Arena.

Every year, there is a large Christmas schedule. There is often at least one television appearance, as well as concerts. The choir host a concert in St. Ann's Church in Dawson Street annually. In 2008 they were the closing act on the Late Late Toy Show.

The choir have received positive reviews from several publications.

The choir is part-funded through revenue derived from the licence fee paid by households with televisions in Ireland.
The choir now also is involved in multiple youtube channels such as Cór na nÓg children's choir

See also
 RTÉ National Symphony Orchestra
 RTÉ Concert Orchestra
 RTÉ Philharmonic Choir
 RTÉ Vanbrugh Quartet

References

External links
 Official Site

Choirs of children
Irish choirs
Musical groups established in 1987
Cór na nÓg